The Longest Night, published in 2002, is a novel in the form of twelve connected short stories based on the American television series Angel.

Plot summary

It's December 21, and hour by hour Angel and his crew must survive the longest night of the year.

The House Where Death Stood Still
 Written by: Pierce Askegren
 Setting: December 21, 2002, 6pm–7pm

A quest for a missing child taken by his father leads Angel to a house where the father has made a pact. In return for a human sacrifice each winter solstice, both father and son could live forever.

A Joyful Noise
 Written by: Jeff Mariotte
 Setting: December 21, 2002, 7pm–8pm

A group is killing Santas and replacing them with their own people so that the sound of their bells can open a rift in space-time and allow a demon to eat the Earth.

I Still Believe
 Written by: Christopher Golden
 Setting: December 21, 2002, 8pm–9pm

Angel needs help from Cordelia - 4 days before Christmas and he still hasn't done his shopping. But he really is planning a surprise gift for her. They must deal with demonic chaos.

It Can Happen to You
 Written by: Scott Ciencin and Denise Ciencin
 Setting: December 21, 2002, 9pm–10pm

Wesley meets two ghosts from the early Hollywood era who lead him to a better understanding of his life.

Model Behaviour
 Written by: Emily Oz
 Setting: December 21, 2002, 10pm–11pm

Cordelia is invited to become a model, but there is a catch.

Have Gunn, Will Travel
 Written by: Nancy Holder
 Setting: December 21, 2002, 11pm–12pm

The title is a pun on Have Gun — Will Travel, a popular Western TV series which ran in the 1950s and 1960s. The entourage of the prince of a small middle eastern country-who turns out to be a demon in disguise- is worried for his safety. They ask Gunn to impersonate him for an important gathering. Naturally, things don't go as planned.

Generous Presence
 Written by: Yvonne Navarro
 Setting: December 21, 2002, midnight–1am

Having Lilah Morgan send presents was a good idea.  Lilah sends Christmas presents to all, but of course she is not playing nice - it's a ploy to test their resolve.

The Anchoress
 Written by: Nancy Holder
 Setting: December 22, 2002, 1am–2am

A group of wannabe Druids builds a stone circle to sacrifice a virgin. Time-traveling adventures ensue.

Bummed Out
 Written by: Doranna Durgin
 Setting: December 22, 2002, 2am–3am

Something is killing the down-and-outs, and Angel and Co. go undercover to save the day (or night in this case).

Icicle Memories
 Written by: Yvonne Navarro
 Setting: December 22, 2002, 3am–4am

An ice demon shows up in the hotel and plays with people's memories.

Yoke of the Soul
 Written by: Doranna Durgin
 Setting: December 22, 2002, 4am–5am

Christmas carolers are being taken as hosts for a demon race. After freeing the singers and defeating the demons, Angel feels like singing - and does.

The Sun Child
 Written by: Christie Golden
 Setting: December 22, 2002, 5am–6am

The creatures of the night are trying to prevent the new day from starting, and only Angel can ensure the new dawn.

Notes

 Tagline: "Evil arrives on the hour."
 Characters include: Angel, Cordelia, Wesley, Gunn, Fred, Lorne and Lilah Morgan.
 The book is unique, the only anthology of Angel short stories. The book is labeled 'Vol. 1', suggesting further volumes were a possibility, but none were released. There is also an anthology of Buffy short stories in the form of How I Survived My Summer Vacation (which also was labeled Volume 1 despite further installments never appearing).
 Jeff Mariotte explained why the stories do not reference each other:

We didn't get to read each other's stories, we just knew a tiny bit about what would happen in the ones before and after ours. So, for instance, I mentioned in the very end of mine that Angel knew he had to go do some last-minute shopping. But we knew it wouldn't flow exactly right, because if it did then it would be a novel by a buncha different writers, and not a collection of short stories.

Continuity

Supposed to be set early in Angel season 3 – more specifically, December 21, 2001, between 6pm and 6am the next morning.

Canonical issues

Angel books such as this one are not usually considered by fans as canonical. Some fans consider them stories from the imaginations of authors and artists, while other fans consider them as taking place in an alternative fictional reality. However unlike fan fiction, overviews summarizing their story, written early in the writing process, were 'approved' by both Fox and Joss Whedon (or his office), and the books were therefore later published as officially Buffy/Angel merchandise.

References

 The Bronze Forum

External links

Reviews
Litefoot1969.bravepages.com - Review of this book by Litefoot
Shadowcat.name - Review of this book

2002 anthologies
2002 fantasy novels
Angel (1999 TV series) novels
Fantasy anthologies